Montezuma is an unincorporated community in San Miguel County, New Mexico, United States. It is located approximately five miles northwest of the city of Las Vegas.

The town was best known for many years for its natural hot springs, and was in fact called "Los Ojos Calientes". or "Las Vegas Hot Springs" until the late 19th century.

The town consists of ranches, a post office, and the United World College-USA.  The ZIP Code for Montezuma is 87731.

History
Prehistorically, Native Americans valued the hot springs and regarded them therapeutically. According to The Montezuma (New Mexico) Story, the site was initially commercialized in 1840, when a man named McDonald petitioned the Mexican government for the land, and was granted it on the condition he became a Mexican citizen. He then set up a house by the hot springs and charged for admission to the springs. In 1846, after the territory of New Mexico was conquered by the U.S. Army and taken from Mexico, a military hospital was established near the hot springs. This was converted into a hotel in 1862, and replaced by a stone building in 1879.  This was originally called the "Hot Springs Hotel" and is now called "the old stone hotel". Jesse James is among the visitors who stayed there. This building remains extant and is used as an administration building by the United World College-USA.

In 1881 and 1882, the Atchison, Topeka and Santa Fe Railway built the first of three large hotels on the site, running a new small-gauge railroad to the site and renaming the city "Montezuma". Their hotel burned down, as did a much grander stone replacement. The final replacement, constructed in 1886, remains, and has been designated a "national treasure."

The railway company published books about the community in 1898 and 1900; the 1900 text notes that "The Montezuma Hotel is a handsome four-story structure in the chateau style, built of grayish red sandstone and slate. It stands on the north side of the Gallinas where the cañon widens to a small amphitheater, about one hundred feet above the river bed, and commanding attractive views of the pine-clad slopes of the surrounding hills, and a splendid vista through the cañon mouth across the plains and mesas to the dark forest ridge, thirty miles away on the southwestern horizon. The floor of the amphitheater is occupied by a pretty lawn of several acres, with firm turf, primeval pines, seats, flower-beds, and tennis and croquet grounds, while the steep slope up to the hotel is tastily parked with winding drives and walks" Rates at the time were $2.50 to $4.00 by the day, and $52 – $80 by the month, with discounts available under various circumstances. The book particularly recommended the hotel for those suffering from tuberculosis. The 1898 book was even more forceful in its recommendations, calling it "the most desirable resort in the world for those who are afflicted with any form of lung or throat disease." The text goes on to suggest that Northern New Mexico would be palliative for all sick people except for those with "advanced stage" heart disease, who would suffer from the altitude. "Even imaginary ailments give way before forces so potent for good."

The hotel was closed in 1903 and soon thereafter, floods swept away the bath house. The Achison, Topeka, and Santa Fe Railroad company held the property for several years, then transferred it to the Y.M.C.A. for $1, and the Y.M.C.A. in turn sold it to the Baptist church for use as a college. This institution was maintained from 1923 until 1932, after which the Baptist church allowed a variety of entrepreneurial efforts to be launched in the building, but all without success. The property was sold to the Catholic church, and from 1937 until 1972 served as a training site for Mexican priests.

Geography 
The community lies along the Gallinas River, in the Sangre de Cristo Mountains. It is only a few miles from Hermit's Peak.

See also

References

External links

Unincorporated communities in New Mexico
Unincorporated communities in San Miguel County, New Mexico
Hot springs of New Mexico
Landforms of San Miguel County, New Mexico